Abel Hughes  (born 1869) was a Welsh international footballer. He was part of the Wales national football team, playing 2 matches. He played his first match on 12 March 1894 against England and his last match on 24  March 1894 against Scotland.

See also
 List of Wales international footballers (alphabetical)

References

1869 births
Welsh footballers
Wales international footballers
Place of birth missing
Date of death missing
Association footballers not categorized by position